Morley may refer to:

Places

England
 Morley, Norfolk, a civil parish
 Morley, Derbyshire, a civil parish
 Morley, Cheshire, a village
 Morley, County Durham, a village
 Morley, West Yorkshire, a suburban town of Leeds and civil parish
 Morley (UK Parliament constituency), a former constituency in the West Riding of Yorkshire
 Morley, a former wapentake of the West Riding of Yorkshire, later merged into Agbrigg and Morley
 Moreleigh, South Hams, Devon; formerly spelled as "Morley"

United States
 Morley, Colorado, a town
 Morley, Iowa, a city
 Morley, Michigan, a village
 Morley, Missouri, a city
 Morley, New York, a hamlet
 Morley, Tennessee, an unincorporated community

Elsewhere
 Morley, Western Australia, a suburb of Perth
 Electoral district of Morley, an electorate of the Western Australian Legislative Assembly
 Morley, Alberta, Canada, a First Nations settlement
 Morley, Ontario, Canada, a township
 Morley, Meuse, a commune in the Meuse département, France
 Mount Morley, Alexander Island, Antarctica
 Morley Glacier, Victoria Land, Antarctica
 Morley (crater), on the Moon

Schools 
 Morley College, an adult education college in London
 Morley Senior High School, Noranda, Western Australia
 The Morley Academy, a co-educational secondary school in West Yorkshire, England

Titles 
 Earl of Morley, a title in the Peerage of the United Kingdom
 Baron Morley, an abeyant title in the Peerage of England

People 
 Morley (name), a list of people with the surname or given name

Other uses 
 Morley R.F.C., a rugby union club in Morley, West Yorkshire
 Morley Drive, a major road in the suburbs of Perth, Western Australia
 Morley Library, Painesville, Ohio, United States
 Morley Fund Management, a UK-based asset management company
 Morley Pedals, a brand of guitar effects pedals
 Morley (cigarette), a fictional brand of cigarettes seen in many films and television shows
 Morley (cellular automaton) (also called Move), a Life-like cellular automaton with rulestring B368/S245
 Morley, a title character in the Dave and Morley Stories featured on the CBC radio show The Vinyl Cafe
 Morley, a fictional kingdom from the video game Dishonored

See also 
 Morleys Stores, a group of seven department stores in Greater London and several other businesses
 Morleys Hall
 Maury (disambiguation)